Morris County Courthouse may refer to:

Morris County Courthouse (Kansas)
Morris County Courthouse (New Jersey), listed on the NRHP in Morris County, New Jersey
Old Morris County Courthouse, listed on the NRHP in Morris County, Texas